Vedasandur taluk is a taluk of Dindigul district of the Indian state of Tamil Nadu. The headquarters of the taluk is the town of Vedasandur.

Demographics
According to the 2011 census, the taluk of Vedasandur had a population of 324,449 with 162,552  males and 161,897 females. There were 996 women for every 1000 men. The taluk had a literacy rate of 64.8. Child population in the age group below 6 was 16,539 Males and 15,127 Females.

See also
Mongupethanpatty

References 

Taluks of Dindigul district